Hale Township is a township in Jones County, Iowa.

History
Hale Township was organized in 1851. It was is named for Hon. J. P. Hale.

References

Populated places in Jones County, Iowa
Townships in Iowa